Benoît Paillaugue (born 17 November 1987) is a French rugby union player. His position is fly-half or scrum-half and he currently plays for Toulon in the Top 14. He began his professional career with Stade Français in 2008 playing only 2 games before moving to FC Auch Gers in the second division. After only six months with Auch he was signed by Montpellier Hérault in January 2009.

Honours
 2015–16 European Rugby Challenge Cup : winner.

References

1987 births
Living people
French rugby union players
Sportspeople from La Rochelle
Montpellier Hérault Rugby players
RC Toulonnais players
Rugby union fly-halves
Rugby union scrum-halves